William Whare (14 May 1925 – 28 May 1995) was a professional footballer from Guernsey who played as a right-back.

Career
Born in Guernsey, Channel Islands, Whare spent his entire professional career with Nottingham Forest, making 298 appearances in the Football League between 1946 and 1960. Whare represented Forest in the 1959 FA Cup Final, as well as the 1959 FA Charity Shield, before leaving the club to play non-league football with Boston United.

References

1925 births
1995 deaths
Guernsey footballers
Nottingham Forest F.C. players
Boston United F.C. players
English Football League players
Association football fullbacks
FA Cup Final players